The 2015 Supertaça Cândido de Oliveira was the 37th edition of the Supertaça Cândido de Oliveira. It took place on 9 August 2015, and it featured the winners of the 2014–15 Primeira Liga, Benfica, and the winners of the 2014–15 Taça de Portugal, Sporting CP. This edition was sponsored by Vodafone and was known as 2015 Supertaça Cândido de Oliveira Vodafone.

Background
Benfica featured in their 17th Supertaça appearance. Their previous appearance was in 2014, where they defeated Rio Ave 3–2 on penalties at the Estádio Municipal de Aveiro. Benfica have won five Supertaças, in 1980, 1985, 1989, 2005 and 2014.

Sporting CP played in the fixture for the ninth time. Their last appearance was in 2008, where they defeated Porto 2–0 at the Estádio Algarve. Sporting CP have won seven Supertaças, in 1982, 1987, 1995, 2000, 2002, 2007 and 2008.

Pre-match

Entry
Benfica qualified for their second consecutive Supertaça Cândido de Oliveira by clinching the league title. At matchday 33, Benfica drew 0–0 against Vitória de Guimarães at the Estádio D. Afonso Henriques to clinch the Primeira Liga for the 34th time.

Sporting CP qualified by winning the Taça de Portugal, defeating Braga 3–1 on penalties after a 2–2 draw. The 2015 victory was Sporting's 16th Taça de Portugal triumph.

Broadcasting
The final was once again broadcast by Rádio e Televisão de Portugal on RTP1 (and in HD on RTP HD).

Officials

Ticketing

Venue

Match

Details

References

Supertaça Cândido de Oliveira
S.L. Benfica matches
Sporting CP matches
2015–16 in Portuguese football